Emmanuel "Manny" Santo Domingo Lopez (born June 30, 1958) is a Filipino political activist who advocates direct democracy. He is the convenor of such groups as the anti-Bangsamoro Basic Law group that called itself Christian Peace Alliance and the anti-Benigno Aquino III group called EdlSA 2.22.15 Coalition. Previously he formed the EPIRMA, a group of direct democracy advocates. He is currently running for vice president under the Labor Party Philippines in the 2022 Philippine elections.

Personal life 
Lopez was born in Moncada, Tarlac to Rizalino Espejo Lopez, an engineer-farmer, and Olivia Pamintuan Sto. Domingo-Lopez, a public school teacher turned entrepreneur.

Activism

Christian Peace Alliance 
Lopez founded the Christian Peace Alliance to oppose the passage of the Philippine Bangsamoro Basic Law (BBL). In a July 2015 forum in Cebu City, Lopez said the BBL is a clear and present danger to the Philippines' national security, interest and welfare, stating that it was patterned after the Federation of Malaysia. The proposed legislation, he said, will lead to the creation of a Bangsamoro Islamic sub-state controlled by the Moro Islamic Liberation Front, allegedly a Malaysian-backed insurgent group that may eventually lead the sub-state to secede and declare independence. "The Malaysian interest in the passage of the BBL is not to help Filipino Muslims; (the law) is designed for the purpose of creating a buffer state that prevents the Philippines from enforcing its legitimate claim on Sabah," Lopez said. At a press conference prior to the forum, however, Lopez stated that the PCA has written its own version of an ideal BBL.

EdlSA 2.22.15 Coalition 
The EdlSA 2.22.15 movement called for Philippine president Benigno Aquino III's and his cabinet's resignation in February 2015 and held a "people's summit" on mismanagement issues that the group claimed Aquino's government was answerable to the people for, the Mamasapano massacre chief among them.

EPIRMA 
Earlier, in late 2013, Lopez, along with other direct democracy advocates, formed the EPIRMA (Empowered People's Initiative and Reform Movement Alliance), a group that initiated moves for a proper people's initiative or bill against an existing pork barrel system in Philippine government.

In 2014, however, Lopez called the Archbishop of Cebu to seek the agglomeration of all groups on the same people's-initiative route that EPIRMA was taking in order to form a united front or coalition. With the agreement of the other organizations, mainly the Cebu Coalition headed by the Catholic Archdiocese of Cebu, a consequent merger was hatched that culminated in the "People's Congress" in Cebu City that launched the People's Initiative Against the Pork Barrel in August of that year.

Meanwhile, at the same time that EPIRMA prepared for its participation in the initiative launch, Lopez had also been criticizing purportedly questionable military purchases under the Aquino administration.

2022 vice presidential campaign 
Lopez is the nominee of Labor Party Philippines for the 2022 vice presidential election. Lopez is favor of amending the Omnibus Investment Code of 1987. He also preferred on being appointed as secretary of Foreign Affairs or of Trade and Industry if elected as vice president.

Other advocacies 
Lopez has also long been an advocate of environmental disaster preparedness.

References

1958 births
Filipino activists
Filipino political people
Living people
Labor Party Philippines politicians
Candidates in the 2022 Philippine vice-presidential election
People from Tarlac
Politicians from Metro Manila